Lost Pass is a mountain pass crossed by hiking trail in the Olympic Mountains of the state of Washington. It is located on a high ridgeline that separates headwaters of the Dosewallips River from those of the Lost River, just to the west of Lost Peak in the Olympic National Park.

References

Landforms of Olympic National Park
Landforms of Jefferson County, Washington
Mountain passes of Washington (state)
Olympic Mountains